Atrophaneura zaleucus is a species of butterfly from the family Papilionidae that is found in Burma.

The wingspan is 100–110 mm. The wings are black. The body is covered in red hair. There are white markings on the hindwings.

Etymology
It is named in the classical tradition. Zaleucus (ancient Greek: Ζάλευκος; fl. 7th century BC) was a Greek lawgiver.

References

Butterflies described in 1865
Atrophaneura
Butterflies of Asia
Taxa named by William Chapman Hewitson